"In Too Deep" is a song by English pop band Dead or Alive. It was included on their 1985 studio album Youthquake, and was remixed for release as the third single to be taken from the album in June 1985. The choice of song was criticised by producer Pete Waterman, who felt it strayed too far from the formula of the band's mega-hit, "You Spin Me Round (Like A Record)".

It peaked at No. 14 in the UK Singles Chart, No. 61 in Germany and No. 31 in Australia.

Track listing

Chart performance

References

External links

1985 songs
1985 singles
Dead or Alive (band) songs
Epic Records singles
Song recordings produced by Stock Aitken Waterman
Songs written by Pete Burns
Songs written by Tim Lever
Songs written by Mike Percy (musician)